Roger Pilkington may refer to:

Several Rogers in the Pilkington family
Roger de Pilkington, Member of Parliament (MP) for Lancashire in 1316
Roger Pilkington (MP) (died 1407), MP for Lancashire in 1384
Roger Pilkington (collector) (died 1969), British collector of Chinese ceramics
Roger Pilkington (writer) (died 2003), British author and biologist